Jennifer Aniston has been honored with numerous accolades throughout her career. She received nominations for seven Primetime Emmy Awards, five Golden Globe Awards, and eleven Screen Actors Guild Awards. She also received a motion picture star on the Hollywood Walk of Fame.

For her role in the sitcom Friends, Aniston won the Screen Actors Guild Award for Outstanding Performance by an Ensemble in a Comedy Series in 1996, Primetime Emmy Award for Outstanding Lead Actress in a Comedy Series in 2002, and the Golden Globe Award for Best Actress – Television Series Musical or Comedy in 2003. She earned a Primetime Emmy Award nomination in 2009 for her guest starring role on the sitcom 30 Rock. For her performance in the 2014 drama Cake, she received Screen Actors Guild Award and Golden Globe Award nominations. For the Apple TV+ drama series The Morning Show, she won a Screen Actors Guild Award, and earned nominations for a Primetime Emmy Award and two Golden Globes.

Major Awards

Directors Guild Awards 
The Directors Guild Awards are issued by the Directors Guild of America.

0 wins of 1 nomination

Golden Globe Awards 
The Golden Globe Awards are issued by the Hollywood Foreign Press Association (HFPA).

1 win of 7 nominations

Independent Spirit Awards 
0 wins of 1 nomination

Primetime Emmy Awards 
The Primetime Emmy Awards are issued by the Academy of Television Arts & Sciences (ATAS).

1 win of 8 nominations

Screen Actors Guild Awards 
The Screen Actors Guild Awards are issued by the Screen Actors Guild-American Federation of Television and Radio Arts (SAG-AFTRA).

2 win of 13 nominations

Audience Awards

Golden Schmoes Awards 
1 win of 2 nominations

Guys Choice Awards 
1 win of 1 nomination

MTV Movie + TV Awards 
2 wins of 7 nominations

Nickelodeon Kids' Choice Awards 
0 wins of 7 nominations

People's Choice Awards 
8 wins of 17 nominations

Teen Choice Awards 
6 wins of 16 nominations

Critic & Association Awards

Alliance of Women Film Journalists Awards 
2 wins of 4 nominations

Critics Choice Awards 
0 wins of 1 nomination

GLAAD Media Awards 
1 win of 1 nomination

Hollywood Film Awards 
1 win of 1 nomination

Online Film & Television Association Awards 
2 wins of 12 nominations

Online Film Critics Society Awards 
0 wins of 1 nomination

SAG-AFTRA Foundation 
1 win of 1 nominations

Village Voice Film Poll 
1 win of 1 nominations

Women's Image Network Awards 
1 win of 2 nominations

Film Festival Awards

Capri-Hollywood International Film Festival Awards 
1 win of 1 nomination

CineVegas International Film Festival Awards 
1 win of 1 nomination

Giffoni Film Festival Awards 
1 win of 1 nomination

Santa Barbara International Film Festival Awards 
1 win of 1 nomination

ShoWest Convention Awards 
1 win of 1 nomination

International Awards

Aftonbladet TV Prize Awards 
4 wins of 4 nominations

American Comedy Awards 
0 wins of 3 nominations

Jupiter Awards 
0 wins of 1 nomination

Logie Awards 
1 win of 1 nomination

National Movie Awards 
0 wins of 1 nomination

Russian National Movie Awards 
0 wins of 3 nominations

Miscellaneous Awards

AARP Movies for Grownups Awards 
0 win of 1 nomination

Elle Women in Hollywood Awards 
1 win of 1 nomination

Golden Raspberry Awards 
0 wins of 5 nominations

Gracie Allen Awards 
1 win of 1 nomination

People Magazine Awards 
1 win of 1 nomination

Satellite Awards 
0 wins of 3 nominations

Shorty Awards 
0 wins of 1 nomination

The Hollywood Reporter 
1 win of 1 nomination

TV Guide Awards 
1 win of 1 nomination

TV Land Awards 
0 wins of 5 nominations

Walk of Fame Star 
1 win of 1 nomination

Women in Film Crystal + Lucy Awards 
1 win of 1 nomination

Notes

References

External links 
 Jennifer Aniston at Yahoo! Movies
 

Jennifer Aniston
Lists of awards received by American actor